Michael James Gibson (born Derby, 15 July 1939) is an English former professional footballer. He played for Shrewsbury Town, Bristol City and Gillingham between 1960 and 1974  making over 480 Football League appearances in the years since the Second World War.

Career

Mike Gibson played for the England Youth. Sammy Crooks the former England player signed Gibson for Gresley Rovers. The development of his career owes much to Crooks who recommended Gibson to his former teammate Angus Morrison at Nuneaton Borough. 
Mike Gibson left Nuneaton Borough to join Shrewsbury Town in March 1960 helping them to reach the League Cup semi finals in 1960-61. Fred Ford signed Gibson from Shrewsbury Town for £6,000 for Bristol City in April 1963. Mike Gibson helped Bristol City reach the League Cup semi finals in 1970-71. Mike Gibson moved to Gillingham in July 1972 and starred in their promotion success in 1973-74.

A shoulder injury ended Mike Gibson's playing career after which he returned to Bristol as a postman. He has assisted Bristol City as goalkeeping coach at Ashton Gate for many years.

References

1939 births
Living people
English footballers
Gresley F.C. players
Nuneaton Borough F.C. players
Gillingham F.C. players
Shrewsbury Town F.C. players
Bristol City F.C. players
Cheltenham Town F.C. players
Footballers from Derby
Association football goalkeepers
British postmen